Hermann Hinz (13 February 1916 – 21 December 2000) was a German archaeologist who was Professor and Head of the Institute for Prehistory and Protohistory at the University of Kiel.

Biography
Hermann Hinz was born in Wangerin, German Empire on 13 February 1916, the son of Wilhelm and Ida Hinz. Since 1937, Hinz studied at Lauenburg. Hinz transferred to the University of Freiburg in 1938, where he studied prehistory, anthropology, art history, history, geology, folklore and classical archaeology. From 1939 to 1941 he worked at Greifswald for his doctorate. He gained his Ph.D. in archaeology at the University of Kiel in 1941.

Hinz served in the Wehrmacht during World War II, and became a prisoner of war. He was released from captivity in 1945, and worked until 1948 as an elementary school teacher in Langenhorn.  From 1949 to 1952 he worked conducted archaeological research in Schleswig-Holstein with a grant from the German Research Foundation. From 1954 to 1965 Hinz held a variety of senior positions at the Rheinisches Landesmuseum Bonn.

Since 1965 Hinz was Associate Professor, and since 1969 Professor, at the University of Kiel. He was also the Director of the Institute for Prehistory and Protohistory at the University.

Hinz retired from Kiel in 1981, and died in Bad Krozingen on 21 December 2000.

Selected works
 Die Ausgrabungen in der Alten reformierten Kirche Wuppertal-Elberfeld, Wuppertal 1954
 Vorgeschichte des nordfriesischen Festlandes, Neumünster, 1954
 Die Vorgeschichte der Kreise Dramburg und Neustettin, Greifswald, 1957
 Xanten zur Römerzeit, Th. Gesthuysen, Xanten 1960
 Kaster, Bedburg/Erft, 1964
 Archäologische Funde und Denkmäler des Rheinlandes / Bd. 2. Kreis Bergheim, 1969
 Das fränkische Gräberfeld von Eick, Berlin, 1969
 Die Ausgrabungen auf dem Kirchberg in Morken, Kreis Bergheim (Erft), Düsseldorf : Rheinland-Verl., 1969
 Germania Romana / 3. Römisches Leben auf germanischem Boden, 1970
 Ein frührömisches Gräberfeld auf dem Kirchhügel in Birten, Kreis Moers. In: Rheinische Ausgrabungen. 12. Rheinland-Verlag, Bonn 1973, S. 24–83.
 Frühe Städte im westlichen Ostseeraum, Kiel, 1973
 Siedlungsforschungen auf den dänischen Inseln und im westlichen Ostseeraum, Kiel, 1980
 Motte und Donjon, Rheinland-Verlag, Köln, 1981, 
 
 Ländlicher Hausbau in Skandinavien vom 6. bis 14. Jahrhundert, Rheinland-Verlag, Köln, 1989,

See also
 Herbert Jankuhn

Selected works

 
 Bernhard Hänsel und Karl W. Struve (Hrsg.): Festschrift Hermann Hinz zum 65. Geburtstag. (= Offa. Berichte und Mitteilungen zur Urgeschichte, Frühgeschichte und Mittelalterarchäologie, 37/1980), Wachholtz, Neumünster 1981, .

1916 births
2000 deaths
German archaeologists
German military personnel of World War II
Germanic studies scholars
University of Kiel alumni